The patent safe game was a confidence trick much practiced during the late Civil War in and around New York City. It is a variation on the coin-matching game, in which the person to be scammed believes they are party to a trick only they and a second person know.

It was carried on principally in the neighborhood of the Hudson River Depot, and the complaints of the victims, to the police, were loud and numerous.

A contemporary account in The Secrets of the Great City describes the trick:

References

Confidence tricks